Frank L. Brothers (born October 24, 1946, in New Orleans, Louisiana) is a former American Thoroughbred racehorse trainer from 1980 to 2009 with a career win percentage of just over 23%, winning 2,291 races, including 262 stakes winners of which 50 were graded stakes wins.  Among those stakes winners was Hansel who in 1991 won two of the three U.S. Triple Crown races. He was voted the Outstanding Thoroughbred Trainer Award from the United Thoroughbred Trainers of America in 1991 and was inducted into the Fair Grounds Racing Hall of Fame that same year. In 2015 he was inducted into the Louisiana Sport's Hall of Fame.

Beyond Hansel, Brothers also trained Secret Hello (GI); Arch (GI); Pulpit (GII); Mighty (GII); Oath (GI), Madcap Escapade (GI) and First Samurai (GI).  Many of these horses Frank purchased at auction and developed into stakes winners. Frankie's complete list of Graded stakes winners he trained: Appealing Breeze; Arch; Auto Dial; Barkerville; Beal Street Blues; Bel Air Beauty; Conserve; Dansil; Fast Catch; First Samurai; Frisco View; Hansel; Madcap Escapade; Mighty; Move; Noble Savage; Oath; Ocean Crest; Pulpit; Secret Hello; Tessa Blue; Trip and Watch.

Graded Stakes winners he's purchased AND trained: Arch, Beal Street Blues; Bel Air Beauty; First Samurai; Hansel; Madcap Escapade; Mighty; Secret Hello and Tessa Blue.

Graded Stakes winners he's purchased but did not train: Algorithms, Intense Holiday (MGSW), Itsaknockout, Position Limit, Shanghai Bobby (MGSW), and Uncle Vinny.

Upon retirement from training Frank became a bloodstock agent and is presently active in that aspect of the industry.  He buys horses and/or acts as racing advisor for Starlight Racing and a few other clients.  He also works part-time on the sale's inspection team for the Keeneland Racing Association. Since beginning his career as a bloodstock agent he has purchased—as yearlings—graded stakes winners: Algorithms, Intense Holiday (MGSW), Itsaknockout, Position Limit, Shanghai Bobby (MGSW), Uncle Vinny and Cutting Humor.

A resident of Louisville, Kentucky, Frank Brothers is married to former jockey and television racing analyst, Donna Barton Brothers.

References

1946 births
Living people
American horse trainers
Sportspeople from New Orleans
Sportspeople from Louisville, Kentucky